The 2019 Three Days of Bruges–De Panne was a road cycling one-day race that took place on 27 March 2019 in Belgium. It was the 43rd edition of the Three Days of Bruges–De Panne and the tenth event of the 2019 UCI World Tour. It was won in the sprint by Dylan Groenewegen.

Result

References

Three Days of Bruges-De Panne
Three Days of Bruges-De Panne
Three Days of Bruges-De Panne
Three Days of Bruges–De Panne